A Winter Romance is a 1959 long playing album by Dean Martin, accompanied by an orchestra arranged and conducted by Gus Levene. While not exclusively a Christmas album, it features several songs associated with Christmas as part of its larger winter theme. It was Martin's only Christmas themed album for Capitol Records. Martin later recorded The Dean Martin Christmas Album for Reprise Records in 1966.

The original artwork featured a picture of Martin embracing a fetching young woman. At the same time, he is throwing a passing flirt at a second, attractive woman.

Reception 

The initial Billboard magazine review from November 30, 1959, chose the album as one of its "Spotlight Winners of the Week" and commented that "The tunes are all one the winter kick... Martin sings them with his usual ease and nonchalance... A potent waxing for the holiday season".

Track listing

Original LP 
Capitol (S) T-1285

Side A 
"A Winter Romance" (Sammy Cahn, Ken Lane) – 2:57
Session 7875S; Master 32161; Take 10. Recorded August 4, 1959.
"Let It Snow! Let It Snow! Let It Snow!" (Jule Styne, Sammy Cahn) – 1:55
Session 7882; Master 32194; Take 15. Recorded August 6, 1959.
"The Things We Did Last Summer" (Jule Styne, Sammy Cahn) – 3:37
Session 7851; Master 32147; Take 8. Recorded July 29, 1959.
"I've Got My Love to Keep Me Warm" (Irving Berlin) – 2:43
Session 7875S; Master 32164; Take 8. Recorded August 4, 1959.
"June in January" (Leo Robin, Ralph Rainger) – 2:46
Session 7875S; Master 32162; Take 6. Recorded August 4, 1959.
"Canadian Sunset" (Eddie Heywood, Norman Gimbel) – 3:18
Session 7851; Master 32150; Take 4. Recorded July 29, 1959.

Side B 
"Winter Wonderland" (Felix Bernard, Dick Smith) – 1:51
Session 7851; Master 32148; Take 7. Recorded July 29, 1959.
"Out in the Cold Again" (Rube Bloom, Ted Koehler) – 3:34
Session 7882; Master 32191; Take 12. Recorded August 6, 1959.
"Baby, It's Cold Outside" (Frank Loesser) – 2:23
Session 7882; Master 32192; Take 15. Recorded August 6, 1959.
"Rudolph the Red-Nosed Reindeer" (Johnny Marks) – 2:15
Session 7882; Master 32193; Take 4. Recorded August 6, 1959.
"White Christmas" (Berlin) – 2:28
Session 7851; Master 32149; Take 7. Recorded July 29, 1959.
"It Won't Cool Off" (Cahn, Lane) – 2:27
Session 7875S; Master 32163; Take 7. Recorded August 4, 1959.

Reissues 
The LP was reissued in 1965 as Holiday Cheer (Capitol STT-2343) as well as on the cassette tape, with different cover art and the song "A Winter Romance" omitted.  This version charted for 11 weeks peaking at #12 on Billboard's Best Bets For Christmas album chart December 14, 1968.

The 1989 Capitol CD reissue added a thirteenth bonus track following to the original album.
"The Christmas Blues" (David Holt, Cahn) – 2:54.
Session 3176; Master 11943–8; Take 8. Recorded October 5, 1953.

The 2005 Collectors' Choice Music CD reissue added four (non-Christmas) bonus tracks to the original album.
"Meanderin'" (Cy Coben, Charles Randolph Grean, George Botsford) – 2:58
Session 2309; Master 9022–7. Recorded September 15, 1951.
"Sogni d'Oro" (Marilyn Keith, Lew Spence, Alan Bergman) – 2:35
Session 7751; Master 31662–14. Recorded May 13, 1959.
"Go Go Go Go" (Jerry Livingston, Mack David) – 2:22
Session 2092; Master 7256–7. Recorded June 20, 1951.
"Buttercup of Golden Hair" (Mitchell Tableporter) – 2:18
Session 7757; Master 31694–3. Recorded May 15, 1959.

Personnel 

Dean Martin – vocals
Gus Levene – leader
Hy Lesnick – contractor
Joseph R. (Bobby) Gibbons – guitar
George Sylvester 'Red' Callender – bass guitar
Louis 'Lou' Singer – drums
James Rowles – piano on sessions 7851 and 7882
Ray I. Sherman – piano on session 7875S
Edward Ross – accordion on session 7882
Kurt Reher – cello
Eleanor Aller Slatkin – cello
Kathryn Julye – harp on sessions 7875S and 7882
Donald Cole – viola
Alvin Dinkin – viola on session 7875S
Virginia Majewski – viola
David H. Sterkin – viola on session 7851
Israel Baker – violin on session 7882
Victor Bay – violin
John Peter DeVoogt – violin
Nathan Kaproff – violin
Joseph Livoti – violin
Daniel 'Dan' Lube – violin
Erno Neufeld – violin
Jerome 'Jerry' Reisler – violin
Ralph Schaeffer – violin on session 7875S
Felix Slatkin – violin on sessions 7851 and 7882
Gerald Vinci – violin on sessions 7851 and 7875S
Arnold Koblentz – oboe on sessions 7851 and 7875S
James Briggs – saxophone on session 7882
Mahlon Clark – saxophone on sessions 7875S and 7882
Arthur 'Skeets' Herfurt – saxophone on session 7875S
Edward Kuczborski ('Eddie' Kusby) – saxophone on session 7875S
Harry Klee – saxophone on session 7882
Ronald Langinger – saxophone on session 7875S
Theodore M. 'Ted' Nash – saxophone on session 7851
Emanuel 'Mannie' Klein – trumpet on session 7875S

Charts

Certifications

Notes 

1959 Christmas albums
Albums recorded at Capitol Studios
Capitol Records Christmas albums
Christmas albums by American artists
Dean Martin albums
Pop Christmas albums
Concept albums